The 2021 CFL National Draft was a selection of National players by Canadian Football League teams that took place at May 4, 2021 at 7:00 pm ET and was broadcast on TSN and RDS. 54 players were chosen from among eligible players from Canadian universities across the country, as well as Canadian players playing in the NCAA. Unlike previous drafts, where the selection order was determined by the previous year's standings, this year's draft order was determined by a random draw.

The draft was broadcast live on TSN for the first two rounds. Due to the ongoing COVID-19 pandemic, some commentators broadcast from remote locations as opposed to in-studio. The TSN production was hosted by Rod Smith and featured the CFL on TSN panel which included Farhan Lalji, Duane Forde, and Davis Sanchez. Randy Ambrosie, the CFL commissioner, was in the TSN studios in Toronto to announce the picks for the first two rounds.

Format changes
Due to the cancellation of the 2020 CFL season as a result of the COVID-19 pandemic in Canada, the 2021 CFL Draft underwent several changes. Since there was no previous season and standings, the draft order was a random draw with all nine teams having the same odds of being drawn. Every even-numbered round is in the reverse order of the odd-numbered rounds to balance the randomness of the draft order. The number of rounds in the draft decreased from eight to six due to the large number of rookies that will be present in camps (those from the 2020 CFL Draft class). To accommodate that change, and due to U Sports and some NCAA programs not playing in 2020, eligible 2021 draftees were able to defer their draft years to 2022. Following the November 30, 2020 deadline, 132 U Sports players opted out of the 2021 Draft, which substantially reduced the available players this year. This led to speculation that NCAA redshirt juniors could be included in the draft to add more talent available this year which would also balance out the massive influx of players in 2022. This was confirmed when the league released the winter player rankings on January 20, 2021.

Further to those changes, there will be no territorial selections in 2021, after featuring them in the previous two drafts.

Unrelated to COVID-19 changes, beginning with this year's draft, any American or Global player that played football for a minimum of three years at a U Sports institution and graduated with a degree at that institution would qualify as a National player and be eligible for this year's draft.

Top prospects
Source: CFL Scouting Bureau rankings.

Draft order

Round one

Round two

Round three

Round four

Round five

Round six

Trades
In the explanations below, (D) denotes trades that took place during the draft, while (PD) indicates trades completed pre-draft.

Round one
 Montreal → Hamilton (PD).  Montreal traded this selection, Jamaal Westerman, Chris Williams, and a first-round pick in the 2020 CFL Draft to Hamilton in exchange for Johnny Manziel, Tony Washington, and Landon Rice.

Round four
 BC → Toronto (PD).  BC traded this selection and Davon Coleman to Toronto in exchange for Shawn Lemon.

Round five
 Toronto → Calgary (PD).  Toronto traded this selection and a third-round pick in the 2021 CFL Global Draft to Calgary in exchange for a sixth-round pick in this year's draft, a fourth-round pick in the 2021 CFL Global Draft, and the rights to Eric Rogers, Cordarro Law, and Robertson Daniel.

Round six
 Winnipeg ←→ Toronto (PD).  Winnipeg traded the 52nd overall selection and the playing rights to Cody Speller to Toronto in exchange for the 48th overall selection.
 Calgary → Toronto (PD).  Calgary traded this selection, a fourth-round pick in the 2021 CFL Global Draft, and the rights to Eric Rogers, Cordarro Law, and Robertson Daniel to Toronto in exchange for a fifth-round pick in this year's draft and a third-round pick in the 2021 CFL Global Draft.

References
Trade references

General references

Canadian College Draft
2021 in Canadian football